is an actor and J-Pop artist in Japan.

He first became famous when he applied to a "star birth" audition, at the age of 15.  He released his first single "irukani-notta-shounen" (boy who rode on the dolphin) in 1973, which was his most well-known song. At the age of 20, he stopped singing, to study at the Komazawa university in Tokyo, but then left at the age of 23 to return to Hiroshima. In Hiroshima, he lived with his parents and worked for them, in their electrical appliance shop. He then got married when he was 25, and moved to Tokyo. His first child (a son) was born 2 years later. He then divorced but then remarried again when he was 34, and soon after that, his daughter was born.

His most famous television appearance was Takeshi's Castle during the late 1980s where he played the role of one of the many henchmen working for the lord, Takeshi Kitano. Despite the rumours outside Japan, Michiru is not Takeshi Kitano's nephew.

Most recently, he got a job on local TV channel "Hiroshima TV" on a programme called "Susume, sports-genkimaru" where he talked about fishing once a month. The programme is still shown in Hiroshima, but it is unknown whether or not he is still on it.

He is still listed as a "Class D Entertainer", which means that his appearance fee is between 1 and 2 million yen.

References

Japanese entertainers
1957 births
Living people
People from Kure, Hiroshima
Musicians from Hiroshima Prefecture